The Rockne was an American automobile brand produced by the Studebaker Corporation of South Bend, Indiana, from 1932 to 1933. The brand was named for University of Notre Dame football coach Knute Rockne and were produced in Detroit, Michigan.

US production 
Discussions between Studebaker and Knute Rockne began in 1928. Rockne was offered a high-visibility job by Studebaker president Albert Erskine. Studebaker planned for a durable, inexpensive car. The Rockne would replace the slow-selling, unduly expensive Erskine car.

There were two prototypes that some would consider 1931 Rocknes. In 1930, Ralph Vail and Roy Cole operated an engineering/consulting firm in Detroit. Willys-Overland commissioned them to design a new small six and build two prototypes. Upon presenting the two vehicles to W-O the independent designers/engineers were told W-O was on the verge of bankruptcy and they could do what they wanted with the cars, one a sedan, one a coupe. Vail stopped in South Bend and demonstrated the car to Albert Erskine, at that time president of the Studebaker Corporation. Erskine bought the design that day and both Vail and Cole would be brought into the Studebaker organization.
The Rockne moniker was a later adoption so, technically, there were no 1931 Rocknes.

On March 31, 1931, 12 days after being appointed manager of sales promotion, Knute Rockne was killed in an airplane crash. In September, 1931, George M. Graham, formerly of Willys-Overland, was named sales manager of the new Rockne Motor Corporation. Two models were approved for production, the "65" on  wheelbase and the "75" on a  wheelbase. The "75" was based on the Studebaker Six, while the "65" was based on designs by Vail and Cole, the two engineers under contract for Willys-Overland. The "75" was designed under Studebaker's head of engineering, Delmar "Barney" Roos.

Production of the Rockne "75" began at South Bend on December 15, 1931. The smaller "65" went into production at the old E-M-F plant on Piquette Avenue in Detroit, February 22, 1932. This was the same plant at which the 1927 and 1928 Erskine models had been built. The Rockne also went into production at Studebaker's Canadian plant at Walkerville, Ontario, near Windsor.

The 1933 Rockne line was reduced to one line, the "10". The Rockne "10" was an update of the "65". When Studebaker went into receivership on March 18, 1933, it was decided to move production of the Rockne to the Studebaker plant in South Bend. The Rockne "10" was built in South Bend from April through July, 1933.

The Rockne "65/10" engine would replace all the six-cylinder Studebaker car engines then in production and power Studebaker Dictator and Commander cars until World War II.  This engine would also power postwar Commanders and Land Cruisers until the V8 became available for 1951.  This engine would also be the larger of two six cylinder engines offered in trucks through 1960.

Although the Rockne was not a success, its failure was a product of the times. The year 1932 was the bottom of the depression, not a good time to introduce a new name.

Rockne abroad 
Rockne was assembled at Studebaker’s Canadian plant across the Detroit River at Walkerville, Ont.

There was a small assembly production of Rockne in Scandinavia in 1932 and 1933.

Norway:  About 90 Rockne 65 and 75 were assembled by A/S Skabo Jernbanevognfabrik.

Denmark: A small, unknown number of Rockne 65 was assembled in Copenhagen by De Forenede Automobilfabrikker A/S.

References

Literature
 
 
 
 
 Antique Studebaker Review, Volume 3, Number 4, November, 1973
 Bertheau, Øistein/Stokke, Christian: Made in Norway? Historien om forsøk på bilproduksjon i Norge, Norsk teknisk Museum 1991  (in Norwegian)
 Karsholt, Erich: Dansk Bilproduktion. Bil- og samlefabrikker i det 20. århundrede, Strandbergs forlag 2020  (in Danish)

External links
 Rockne history at Autonet.ca
 http://www.theantiquestudebakerclub.com/rockne/rockne.htm

Defunct motor vehicle manufacturers of the United States
Rockne (marque)
Studebaker
Motor vehicle manufacturers based in Michigan
Vehicle manufacturing companies established in 1932
Vehicle manufacturing companies disestablished in 1933
Pre-war vehicles
1930s cars
Cars introduced in 1932